Aikawa may refer to:

People
Aikawa (surname)

Places
Aikawa, Akita, a former town in Kitaakita District, Akita Japan; it was merged with other towns to form Kitaakita
Aikawa, Kanagawa, a town in Aiko District, Kanagawa, Japan
Aikawa, Niigata, a town on Sado Island, Niigata Prefecture, Japan, famous for its former gold mines